John Walker-Heneage (17 May 1730 - 26 February 1806) was the member of Parliament for Cricklade in England from 4 April 1785 to June 1794.

He was hereditary usher to the Court of Exchequer as well as holding other hereditary positions.

References 

Members of Parliament for Cricklade
1730 births
1806 deaths